Nocardioides aquaticus is a strictly aerobic, rod-shaped and non-motile bacterium from the genus Nocardioides which has been isolated from tidal flat sediments in Korea.

References

External links
Type strain of Nocardioides aestuarii at BacDive -  the Bacterial Diversity Metadatabase

aestuarii
Bacteria described in 2004